Sir Richard Moore Oval, also known as Kalgoorlie Oval, is a sports venue in Kalgoorlie, Western Australia used primarily for Australian rules football. The ground formerly hosted cricket.
The ground has hosted several West Australian State Premiership matches.

References

City of Kalgoorlie–Boulder
Australian rules football grounds
Cricket grounds in Australia